Friedrich Heinrich may refer to:

 Carl Friedrich Heinrich Credner (1809–1876), German geologist
 Carl Friedrich Heinrich Graf von Wylich und Lottum (1767–1841), Prussian infantry general
 Friedrich Heinrich Bidder (1810–1894), German physiologist and anatomist
 Friedrich Heinrich Geffcken (1830–1896), German diplomat and jurist
 Friedrich Heinrich Himmel (1765–1814), German composer
 Friedrich Heinrich Jacobi (1743–1819), German philosopher
 Friedrich Heinrich von der Hagen (1780–1856), German philologist
 Julius Friedrich Heinrich Abegg (1796–1868), German criminalist

See also

 Frederick Heinrich
 Frederick Henry (disambiguation)
 Heinrich Friedrich
 Henry Frederick (disambiguation)

German masculine given names